Chilgol is a suburb of Pyongyang in the Mangyongdae District.

Chilgol is known as the place where Kang Pan-sok, the mother of Kim Il-sung, North Korea's first leader, was born in 1892 and spent her childhood. The area features many buildings and fixtures related to Kim Il-sung's life. Kim attended Changdok School in Chilgol between 1923 and 1925. According to legend, Kang Pan-sok's father Kang Ton-uk founded the school, although in reality it had been established by the missionary Samuel A. Moffett. Kim Il-sung's desk, in the front of the classroom and left of the teacher, remains preserved there. There are statues for Kim Il-sung, Kang Pan-sok, and Kang Ton-uk, and a marked spot where Kim Il-sung used to read among the trees outside. Also on the premises is Chilgol Church, which Kang Pan-sok used to attend, sometimes with Kim Il-sung, and Chilgol Museum of Revolutionary History. The museum houses Kang Pan-sok's possessions including kitchen utensils. Kang Pan-sok Senior Middle School in Chilgol is named after her.

Although Mangyongdae, also in Pyongyang, is traditionally considered the birthplace of Kim Il-sung, he wrote in his memoirs that he was in fact born in Chilgol where Kang Pan-sok had gone to give birth.

Chilgol is designated as a Revolutionary Site, built up in July 1954. The Namchongang Trading Corporation is based in Chilgol. Oryu Valley nearby hosts a large strawberry farm.

See also

 Chilgol Station
 Samuel Austin Moffett

References

Works cited

Geography of Pyongyang
Historic sites in North Korea
Kim dynasty (North Korea)